Ghulam Ahmad or Ghulam Ahmed. can refer to

Mirza Ghulam Ahmad (1835–1908), Indian religious figure, founder of the Ahmadiyya movement
Ghulam Ahmad Faroghi  (1861–1919), scholar of Arabic and Persian language at Bhopal state
Peerzada Ghulam Ahmad, known as Mahjoor (1885–1952), Kashmiri poet
Ghulam Ahmed Pervez (1903–1985), Pakistani Islamic scholar
Ghulam Ahmed Chishti (1905–1994), Indian/Pakistani music composer, one of the founders of Pakistani film music
Ghulam Ahmed (cricketer) (1922–1998), Indian cricketer
Ghulam Ahmad (forester) (1923–2003), Pakistani forestry official, later managing director of chrome mining company
Ghulam Ahmad Bilour (born 1939), Pakistani politician
Ghulam Ahmed Hasan Mohammed Parkar, known as Ghulam Parkar (born 1955), Indian cricketer
Ghulam Ahmad Ashai, Kashmiri bureaucrat and political leader